Sogariya is a census town in Kota District in the Indian state of Rajasthan.

Demographics
 India census, Sogariya had a population of 8,832. Males constitute 53% of the population and females 47%. Sogariya has an average literacy rate of 74%, equal to the national average of 74%: male literacy is 85%, and female literacy is 62%. In Sogariya, 12% of the population is under 6 years of age. Sogariya has one patrol pump but an ATM is still required.

References

Cities and towns in Kota district